The following is a list of notable Renaissance structures.

Belgium
 Antwerp City Hall

Czech Republic
 Château of Litomyšl
 Villa Belvedere in Prague

Denmark
 Kronborg Castle
 Rosenborg Castle
 Børsen

England
 Longleat, Wiltshire (1567–1580)
 Banqueting House, London (1619–1622)
 Queen's House, Greenwich, London (1616–1617)

France
Château d'Amboise
Château de Blois
Château de Chambord
Château de Châteaubriant
Château de Chenonceau
Château de Fontainebleau
Château de Laval
Hôtel d'Assézat

Germany
 Schloss Johannisburg
 Ahrensburg Castle 
 Augsburg Town Hall 
 Bremen City Hall 
 Cologne City Hall 
 Düsseldorf City Hall 
 Heidelberg Castle 
 Leipzig City Hall 
 Munich Residenz 
 Schwerin Castle

Hungary
 Visegrád, Royal Summer Palace
 Bakócz Chapel in Esztergom

Italy
Bergamo, Colleoni Chapel
Brescia, Palazzo della Loggia
 Dome of khairo-Italian scilia
 Florence
 Dome of Santa Maria del Fiore (by Filippo Brunelleschi)
 Ospedale degli Innocenti (by Filippo Brunelleschi)
 Sagrestia Vecchia (by Filippo Brunelleschi)
 Basilica di San Lorenzo di Firenze (by Filippo Brunelleschi)
 Santo Spirito (by Filippo Brunelleschi)
 Pazzi Chapel at Basilica di Santa Croce (by Filippo Brunelleschi)
 Palazzo Medici (by Michelozzo)
 Palazzo Pitti (unknown architect)
 Palazzo Strozzi
 Façade of Santa Maria Novella (by L.B. Alberti)
 Palazzo Rucellai (by L.B. Alberti)
 Uffizi (by Giorgio Vasari)
 Rimini, Tempio Malatestiano (by Leon Battista Alberti)
 Mantua
 Sant'Andrea (by Leon Battista Alberti)
 Palazzo Te (by Giulio Romano)
 Urbino, Palazzo Ducale (by Luciano Laurana)
 Milan
Santa Maria presso San Satiro (by Bramante)
 Santa Maria delle Grazie (by Bramante)
 Rome
 Capitoline Museums (by Michelangelo)
Palazzo Farnese (by Giuliano da Sangallo the Younger and Michelangelo)
 San Pietro in Montorio (by Bramante)
 Cloister of Santa Maria della Pace (by Bramante)
 Villa Farnesina
 Villa Farnese, Caprarola (by Giacomo Barozzi da Vignola)
Urbino
Ducal Palace
 Venice 
 Loggetta of St. Mark's Campanile (by Jacopo Sansovino?)
 Biblioteca Marciana (by Jacopo Sansovino)
Scuola Grande di San Marco
Vicenza
Basilica Palladiana
 Villa Capra "La Rotonda" (by A. Palladio)

Lithuania
 Biržai Castle
 Panemunė Castle 
 Radziwill Palace in Vilnius
 Raudondvaris Palace
 Royal Palace of Lithuania (or the Lower Castle) in Vilnius
 St. Michael's Church in Vilnius

Poland
 Wawel Castle in Kraków
 Sigismund's Chapel at Wawel Cathedral in Kraków
 Old City of Zamość
 Cathedral in Zamość
 Cloth Hall in Kraków
 Poznań Town Hall
 Town Hall in Chełmno
 Krasiczyn Castle
 Brzeg Castle
 Pieskowa Skała Castle
 Firlej Chapel in Bejsce
 Loitz house in Szczecin
 Houses and parish church in Kazimierz Dolny
 Great Arsenal in Gdańsk
 Upper Gate in Gdańsk
 Green Gate in Gdańsk
 Castle in Drzewica 
 Baranów Sandomierski Castle
 Jesuit Church, Warsaw
 Town Hall in Chełmno
 Castle in Płakowice near Lwówek Śląski
 Pruszków Castle
 Niemodlin Castle
 Castle in Siedlisko

Portugal
Cloister of John III in Convent of the Order of Christ, in Tomar
Church of Nossa Senhora da Graça, in Évora

Russia
 Archangel Cathedral of the Moscow Kremlin

Spain
 El Escorial (by Juan Bautista de Toledo and Juan de Herrera)
 New Cathedral of Salamanca (by Juan de Álava and others)
 Palace of Monterrey in Salamanca (by Rodrigo Gil de Hontañón)
 Arzobispo Fonseca College in Salamanca (by Diego de Siloé, Juan de Álava and R. G. de Hontañón)
 Convent of St. Stephen in Salamanca, (by Juan de Álava and R. G. de Hontañón)
 Palace of Guzmanes in León (by R. G. de Hontañón)
 Hospital de la Santa Cruz in Toledo (by Enrique Egas and Alonso de Covarrubias)
 Hospital Tavera, in Toledo (by Bartolomé Bustamante)
 Hospital Real, in Granada (by Enrique Egas)
 Palace of Charles V in Granada (by Pedro Machuca)
 Cathedral of Granada (by Juan Gil de Hontañón, Enrigue Egas and Diego de Siloé)
 Cathedral of Jaén (by Andrés de Vandelvira)
 Cathedral of Baeza (by Vandelvira)
 University of Alcalá de Henares (by Rodrigo Gil de Hontañón and others)
 Hostal de los Reyes Católicos of Santiago de Compostela (by Enrique Egas)

Sweden
 Gripsholm Castle, Mariefred
 Kalmar Castle, Kalmar

See also

Structures
Renaissance
Renaissance